Meyer & Holler was an architecture firm based in Los Angeles, California, noted for its opulent commercial buildings and movie theatres, including Grauman’s Chinese and Egyptian theatres, built during the 1920s. Meyer & Holler was also known as The Milwaukee Building Company.

Design build
The Milwaukee Building Company was established in 1905 as a design and construction firm, with Mendel Meyer as President, Gabriel Holler as Vice President, and Julius C. Schneider as Secretary. In 1911, they were joined by Phillip W. Holler.

The Milwaukee Building Company became the Los Angeles-based architectural office of Meyer & Holler, an eminent firm responsible for the design of numerous Southern California landmark buildings. The company opted for the Design-build approach very early in its history. The architectural firm to design the structure and the Milwaukee Building Company to build it. Only on very rare occasions did it contract to erect projects designed by independent architects. In the 1920s in Los Angeles, Meyer & Holler were one of the most esteemed architectural firms, and the Milwaukee Building Company was the largest contracting firm.

At first emphasizing residential work of an increasingly important scale, Meyer & Holler switched to an emphasis on commercial work after World War I. Integral to the company's strategy for success was the offering of architectural design services of an unusually high level of quality, which it was able to due as a result of hiring some of the finest architectural design talent available in Southern California in the 1910s and 1920s.

Meyer and Holler was founded by Gabriel S. Meyer and Philip W. Holler  Meyer & Holler also designed and built apartment buildings, hotels, banks, and churches. A number of Meyer & Holler buildings are now on the National Register of Historic Places. Incorporated in 1906, Meyer & Holler developed into one of the largest building firms in Los Angeles before declaring bankruptcy in 1932 as an indirect result of litigation related to California’s architectural registration laws.

Associated architects and draftsmen
 Raymond M. Kennedy
 Donald Reuben Wilkinson (1890–1975) chief architect (1920–1932)
 Lewis Elbert Blaize, bungalow designer
 Kenneth Wing

Selected works 

 Mount Washington Hotel and Inn, Los Angeles (1909)
 Henry Weaver House, Santa Monica (1910)
 Isaac Milbank House, Santa Monica (1911)
Herivel House, Highland Park (1912)
 Elizabeth Milbank Anderson House, Long Beach (1912)
 L.L. Burns Building, Los Angeles (1914)
 Avis Hotel, Pomona (1915)
 Culver Studios (as the Thomas H. Ince Studios), Culver City (1919)
 Granada Theatre, Hollywood, Los Angeles (1921)
 Thomas McNamara House, Los Angeles (1922)
 Medical Arts Building, Los Angeles (1922)
 Grauman's Egyptian Theatre, Hollywood (1922)
 Café Montmartre, Hollywood (1922)
 Hollywood Athletic Club (1922)
 Southern California Music Company (aka Singer Sewing Machine), Los Angeles (1922)
 Southern California Athletic and Country Club, Lake Elsinore (1924)
 Fox Cabrillo Theatre, San Pedro, California)  (1923) 
 Fox Fullerton (1925)
 Fourth Church of Christ Scientist, Los Angeles (1924)
 Ninth Church of Christ Scientist, Los Angeles (1925)
 Twelfth Church of Christ Scientist, Los Angeles (1931)
 Twenty-Sixth Church of Christ Scientist, Los Angeles (1929)
 Alex Theatre, Glendale, CA
 Petroleum Building, Los Angeles (1925)
 Grauman's Chinese Theatre, Hollywood (1926)
 Aztec Theatre, San Antonio, Texas  (1926)
 Quinby Office Building, Los Angeles (1926)
 First National Bank of Hollywood (1927)
 Masonic Lodge, Wilshire Blvd, Los Angeles (1928)
 Hillcrest Motors, Hollywood (1929)
 Walker Building, Long Beach (1929)
 Ocean Center Building, Long Beach (1929)
 E. Clem Wilson Building, Los Angeles (1930)

References 

 Willis, Alfred. (2000). Design-Build in Early Modern Los Angeles: A Case Study of Meyer & Holler. In Formulation and Fabrication: The Arehitecture of History, 599-604. Wellington, NZ: Society of Architectural Historians of Australia and New Zealand.
 Meyer & Holler v. H. D. Bowman (121 California Appellate Reports 112)
 Meyer & Holler v. Ramona Village (March 29, 1935. Civ. No. 8788 . 5 Cal.App.2d 688).
 Construction History Society Newsletter
Meyer & Holler

External links 

Defunct architecture firms based in California
Defunct companies based in Greater Los Angeles